Peep This is the debut studio album by American singer and actor Jamie Foxx, then of In Living Color fame. It was released on July 19, 1994, by Fox Records. The album peaked at #78 on the Billboard 200. The album received mixed to negative reviews.

His next album, Unpredictable, was released in 2005.

Music videos were made for the track "Infatuation" and "Experiment". The music video for "Experiment" was briefly seen in Home Alone 3.

Track listing

Notes
All songs written or co-written by Jamie Foxx. Samples include "Beatbox (Diversion One)" (as performed by Art of Noise) and “I Need a Freak” (as performed by Sexual Harassment) on “Miss You”, and "If I Was Your Girlfriend" (as performed by Prince) on “Your Love”.

Charts

Personnel
Jamie Foxx (vocals, piano)
The Poetess (rap)
Victor White (guitar, background vocals)
Kenny Ford, Sr. (piano)
Kenny Ford, Jr. (bass)
Jeffrey Suttles (drums)
Keith Martin, Sheree Ford-Payne, Anastacia Newkirk, Nathan Walton, Jerome Monroe, Emage (background vocals)
DaMone Arnold

References

Jamie Foxx albums
1994 debut albums
20th Century Fox Records albums